Franz Joseph von Stein (4 April 1832 – 4 May 1909) was Archbishop of München und Freising from 1897 until 1909.

Biography
Born 4 April 1832, Amorbach, on 10 August 1855, aged 23, he was ordained a priest of Würzburg, Germany and consecrated by archbishop Friedrich von Schreiber and Bishops Joseph Georg von Ehrler and Joseph Franz von Weckert.

On 19 October 1878, aged 46, he was appointed Bishop of Würzburg, and confirmed and ordained early the following year. On 24 December 1897, aged 65, he was appointed  Archbishop of München und Freising and installed on 18 April 1898.

In 1900 he acted the religious wedding of Princess Elisabeth of Bavaria, and was given the Grand Cordon of Leopold, by king Leopold II.

He died on 4 May 1909, aged 77. He had been a priest for 53 years and a bishop for 30 years.

Honours 
 1900 : Grand Cordon of the Order of Leopold.

References

External links
Catholic Hierarchy

1832 births
1909 deaths
Roman Catholic archbishops of Munich and Freising
People from Amorbach
19th-century Roman Catholic archbishops in Germany
20th-century Roman Catholic archbishops in Germany
Members of the Bavarian Reichsrat
Burials at Munich Frauenkirche
20th-century German Roman Catholic priests
German Roman Catholic archbishops